Hurghada International Airport  is the international airport of Hurghada in Egypt. It is the second busiest airport in Egypt after Cairo International Airport and an important destination for leisure flights mainly from Europe.

Terminal

The airport currently has two passenger terminals: Terminal 1 and Terminal 2. Construction of the new terminal complex cost $335 million, which was mainly financed by the Arab Fund for Economic Development. Egypt's aviation minister, Houssam Kamal, said that the airport would be able to host up to 13 million visitors annually. The project was inaugurated by President Abdel Fattah el-Sisi on December 17, 2014. The new terminal has a total area of 92,000 square meters on three levels. The departure hall has 72 check-in counters and 20 departure gates.

Airlines and destinations
The following airlines operate regular scheduled and charter flights at Hurghada Airport:

Ground transportation
Car hire is available at the airport. Regular taxis, tourist taxis and minibuses operate from the airport as well.

References

External links

Hurghada
Airports in Egypt